The Peru national tennis team is the Davis Cup team that represents the nation of Peru. The team is governed by the Federación de Tenis de Peru.  They currently compete in the Americas Zone Group II, and their best result was reaching the World Group in 2008.

History
Although in 1959 Peruvian-born Alex Olmedo had won the Davis Cup participating with the United States team, the first participation by a Peruvian team was in 1968 (a 3-0 loss to Chile). Even though, officially, Peru's participation the Davis Cup had started in 1933; its presentations in the years of 1933, 1934, and 1950 were all walk-over losses.

Peru's first victory would come in 1976, when the team defeats Uruguay at Montevideo, by a margin of 2-3. Players Miguel Maurtúa and Fernando Maynetto were an important part of this team. Peru's next rival was Brazil, and the result was a 5-0 loss for the Peruvians.

The first great participation of Peru's Davis Cup history came up in 1989, by defeating Ecuador 5-0 and Brazil 3-2. Thus, the team made it into the World Group playoffs. Peru's rival was the Australia of Cahill and Masur. The game disputed in Lima resulted in a 3-2 win for Australia. Peruvian tennis players Jaime Yzaga, Pablo Arraya, and Carlos Di Laura were already beginning to show their skill.

The early 90s proved disastrous for Peru, who got relegated to Group II of the Americas zone. Upon returning to Group I in 1994, the Yzaga-led team was able to beat Mexico, Chile, and Brazil by 3-2 margins each time, qualifying for the World Group playoffs again. This time the team lost to Denmark 4-1.

The team was relegated to the Americas Zone Group 2 for the 1997 season, but returned to Group 1 in 2000. The following year they were relegated again but also returned in 2003. The team defeated Mexico and Venezuela to qualify for the World Group playoffs again in 2007, where they defeated Belarus 4-1 and secured promotion to the World Group for the first time.

In 2008 Davis Cup World Group, Peru played this stage of premium tennis for the first and only time in its history. Unfortunately, the national team of Spain was the rival of Peru. Although having Rafael Nadal and David Ferrer, Spain played with a "B" team. But nevertheless, the Spain team played like they were locals and the Peruvian team, formed by Ivan Miranda, Mauricio Echazu, Luis Horna and Matías Silva, lost by 0-5 and the dream of playing in the World Group ended there.

Courts
Club Lawn Tennis de la Exposición: Located in the district of Jesús María in Lima, it is the usual court where Peru plays. The court was found in 1884, and was the home scenario for the golden generation of Peruvian tennis players of the 1980s. Its principal colosseum is that of the Buse Brothers.
Court del Boulevard Sur Plaza de Asia: Located in the province of Cañete, this scenario got converted into the principal court for Peru at the starts of this century. A special colosseum was built for the games to be played. This court is located in one of the most important commercial zones of the Lima Region.
Rinconada Country Club: Located in the district La Molina of in Lima, it can seat 4,000 spectators.
Club Internacional Arequipa: Located in Arequipa, city in south of the Peruvian Andes, and to 2.335 m. Also is second largest city in Peru. Its principal colosseum is that of Alejandro Olmedo, a former tennis player winner of two Grand Slam (Australian Open and U.S. Open) in 1959.

Current team (2022)

 Juan Pablo Varillas
 Nicolás Álvarez
 Arklon Huertas del Pino
 Gonzalo Bueno
 Sergio Galdós

Former players
 Luis Horna
 Jaime Yzaga
 Iván Miranda
 Américo Venero
 Carlos Di Laura
 Alejandro Aramburu
 Pablo Arraya
 Nicolás Álvarez

See also
Davis Cup
Peru Fed Cup team
List of Peru Davis Cup team representatives

External links

Davis Cup teams
D
Davis Cup